Mahrez is both a surname and a given name. Notable people with the name include:

Brahim Mahrez (born 1972), French-Algerian singer
Riyad Mahrez (born 1991), Algerian footballer
Sidi Mahrez (951–1022), Tunisian jurist
Mahrez Mebarek (born 1985), Algerian swimmer